The 2019–20 Liechtenstein Cup was the 75th season of Liechtenstein's annual cup competition. Seven clubs compete with a total of 15 teams for one spot in the first qualifying round of the 2020–21 UEFA Europa League. FC Vaduz are the defending champions.

On 11 May 2020, the competition was abandoned due to the COVID-19 pandemic in Liechtenstein. The team remaining in the competition with the highest UEFA club coefficient, Vaduz, were selected to play in the 2020–21 UEFA Europa League by the Liechtenstein Football Association, entering the first qualifying round, pending confirmation from UEFA.

Participating clubs

Teams in bold are still active in the competition.

TH Title holders.

First round
The first round involved all except the four highest-placed teams. Five teams received a bye to the second round by drawing of lot. FC Vaduz II did not enter the competition.

|colspan="3" style="background-color:#99CCCC"|

|-
|colspan="3" style="background-color:#99CCCC"|

|}

Second round
The second round involved all except the four highest-placed teams and the three teams eliminated in the first round.

|colspan="3" style="background-color:#99CCCC"|

|-
|colspan="3" style="background-color:#99CCCC"|

|}

Quarterfinals

The quarterfinals involved the four teams who won in the second round, as well as the top four highest placed teams (FC Vaduz, FC Balzers, USV Eschen/Mauren and FC Ruggell).

|colspan="3" style="background-color:#99CCCC"|

|-
|colspan="3" style="background-color:#99CCCC"|

|-
|colspan="3" style="background-color:#99CCCC"|

|}

Semifinals

|colspan="3" style="background-color:#99CCCC"|

|-
|colspan="3" style="background-color:#99CCCC"|

|}

Final

|colspan="3" style="background-color:#99CCCC"|

|}

References

External links
 
RSSSF

Liechtenstein Football Cup seasons
Cup
Liechtenstein Cup
Liechtenstein